Garra joshuai is a species of cyprinid fish in the genus Garra endemic to streams in the Western Ghats in India. It is sometimes placed in the genus Horalabiosa.

References 

Garra
Fish described in 1954
Taxa named by Eric Godwin Silas
Taxobox binomials not recognized by IUCN